With Love and Squalor is the major label debut album from rock band We Are Scientists. It was released in the United Kingdom in October 2005 on Virgin Records and charted at  43, with a large cult following which enabled it to after nearly 6 months of release, gain a gold certification by the BPI in 2006. The album sold an average of 4,166 copies each week before it got the certification. The album title is derived from a J.D. Salinger short story, "For Esmé – with Love and Squalor", which was originally published in The New Yorker and subsequently in Nine Stories, a compilation of Salinger's short stories.

Track listing
All songs written by Keith Murray, Chris Cain and Michael Tapper

The two songs on the 12-inch vinyl edition were both later released on Crap Attack. These songs were also featured on a 3-song CD that was available for purchase during their tour with Hot Hot Heat.

References

We Are Scientists albums
Albums produced by Ariel Rechtshaid
Virgin Records albums
2005 albums